Rasipuram is a neighbourhood in Namakkal district Tamil Nadu, India.

Rasipuram may also refer to:
 Rasipuram town
 Rasipuram block
 Rasipuram taluk 
 Rasipuram (state assembly constituency) 
 Rasipuram (Lok Sabha constituency)
 Rasipuram railway station